An introitus is an entrance into a canal or hollow organ.  The vaginal introitus is the opening that leads to the vaginal canal.

References

External links
 

Anatomy